Patasar is headquarter village of Sankhar village development committee which is in ward number 7 of Syangja District, Gandaki Zone, Western Region, Nepal. According to the Nepal Census 2011 it had a total population of 538, with 216 males and 322 females residing in 124 individual households.

References

External links 
 Population Ward Level

Populated places in Syangja District
Syangja District